Steal Away is an album by pianist Hank Jones and bassist Charlie Haden that was recorded in 1994 and released on the Verve label. Jones and Haden followed Steal Away with a second album of spirituals, Come Sunday, recorded in 2010 and released in 2012.

Reception 
The Allmusic review by Scott Yanow awarded the album 4 stars, stating, "These melodic yet subtly swinging interpretations hold one's interest throughout and reward repeated listenings".

Track listing 
All compositions traditional except as indicated
 "It's Me, O Lord (Standin' in the Need of Prayer)" - 5:22 
 "Nobody Knows the Trouble I've Seen" - 3:44 
 "Spiritual" (Charlie Haden) - 4:20 
 "Wade in the Water" - 4:05 
 "Swing Low, Sweet Chariot" - 2:04 
 "Sometimes I Feel Like a Motherless Child" - 4:31 
 "L' Amour de Moy" - 4:55 
 "Danny Boy" (Frederic Weatherly) - 5:51 
 "I've Got a Robe, You Got a Robe (Goin' to Shout All over God's Heav'n)" - 3:49 
 "Steal Away" - 2:49 
 "We Shall Overcome" - 5:33 
 "Go Down Moses" - 6:04 
 "My Lord, What a Mornin'" - 4:35 
 "Hymn Medley: Abide With Me/Just as I Am Without One Plea/What a Friend We Have in Jesus/Amazing Grace" (Henry Francis Lyte, William Henry Monk/Charlotte Elliott, William Bachelder Bradbury/Joseph M. Scriven, Charles Crozat Converse/John Newton) - 7:37 
Recorded at Radio Canada Studio B in Montreal, Canada on June 29 & 30, 1994

Personnel 
Hank Jones — piano
Charlie Haden — bass

References 

Verve Records live albums
Instrumental duet albums
Gospel albums by American artists
Charlie Haden albums
Hank Jones albums
1995 albums